The List of military units of Estonia contains all military units to serve with the armed forces of Estonia from 1918 to the present day.

Ground Force

Divisions 
Divisions in the Estonian Ground Forces existed till 1940.
1st Division
2nd Division
3rd Division
4th Division

20th Waffen-SS Grenadier Division

Brigades 
Currently the only 2 operational brigades of the Estonian Defence Forces.
1st Infantry Brigade
2nd Infantry Brigade

Regiments
In 1920
1st Infantry Regiment
2nd Infantry Regiment
3rd Infantry Regiment
4th Infantry Regiment
5th Infantry Regiment
6th Infantry Regiment
7th Infantry Regiment
8th Infantry Regiment
9th Infantry Regiment
Kuperjanov Partisan Regiment
Sakala Partisan Regiment
Scouts Regiment
Tallinn Reserve Regiment
Baltic Regiment

Battalions 
Infantry
2nd Single Infantry Battalion
3rd Single Infantry Battalion
4th Single Infantry Battalion
5th Single Infantry Battalion
6th Single Infantry Battalion
8th Single Infantry Battalion
9th Single Infantry Battalion
10th Single Infantry Battalion
Baltic Battalion
Sakala Partisan Battalion
Marine
Marine Landing Battalion

Unsorted
 1st Armored Train Regiment (:et)
 1st Infantry Regiment (Estonia) (:et: 1. Jalaväerügement)
 5th Artillery Group (Estonia)
 5th Infantry Regiment (Estonia)
 6th Infantry Regiment (Estonia)
 Kalevlaste Maleva
 Läänemaa Vabatahtlik Jäägrikompanii